Piotr Haczek (born 26 January 1977 in Żywiec, Śląskie) is a Polish former athlete who mainly competed in the 400 metres. An outdoor and indoor world champion in the 4 x 400 metres relay, his success came mainly in relay, his best individual performance being a gold medal at the 1999 European Under 23 Championships. After retiring from competition he became an athletics coach: among the roles he has held are sports director and head coach of the Polish Athletic Association and sprints coach for Scottish Athletics.

Personal bests
100 metres - 10.58 (1998)
200 metres - 20.97 (2000)
400 metres - 45.43 (2000)

Achievements

See also
Polish records in athletics

Notes

External links

Polish male sprinters
1977 births
Living people
Athletes (track and field) at the 1996 Summer Olympics
Athletes (track and field) at the 2000 Summer Olympics
Olympic athletes of Poland
World Athletics Championships medalists
People from Żywiec
European Athletics Championships medalists
Sportspeople from Silesian Voivodeship
Goodwill Games medalists in athletics
Skra Warszawa athletes
World Athletics Indoor Championships winners
World Athletics Indoor Championships medalists
World Athletics Championships winners
Competitors at the 1998 Goodwill Games
Polish athletics coaches